Tanisha Mariko Harper is an American model actress and television host.

Early life 
Harper was born in Tokyo, Japan. She is of mixed Cherokee and African American descent. At the age of 15 she was discovered in a shopping mall in her hometown of Phoenix, Arizona. At that time, she began her successful modeling career with the Ford Model Agency.

Modeling career 
At the age of 15, Harper began working in print, runway, and commercial modeling and fashion jobs. She has done editorials for numerous magazines, including, Elle, Cosmopolitan, Vanity Fair, and In Style. She has appeared in adverts and catalogs for companies such as, L'Oréal, Smashbox, MAC Cosmetics, Ralph Lauren, Oscar de la Renta, and Tommy Hilfiger'.

She has appeared on both the Oprah Winfrey and Tyra Banks show, and was interviewed by Katie Couric on The Today Show. She also competed as a model during the sixth season of Project Runway, finishing in second place, behind eventual winner Irina Shabayeva's model Kalyn Hemphill. During the show, she was mostly paired with designer Althea Harper, who also finished second.

Acting career 
Harper began her acting career on CBS's The Bold and the Beautiful and co-starred as "Stacey" in the film Something New. She starred as series regular on the Fox-produced drama Desire on MyNetworkTV.  Harper's credits also include ABC's Ugly Betty and the FOX drama Supreme Courtships and a featured role in the Judd Apatow film Forgetting Sarah Marshall. In February 2022, Deadline Hollywood announced Harper had been cast in the role of Jordan Ashford on the soap opera General Hospital; she will make her first appearance in March.

Filmography

Film

Television

References

External links
 
 

Female models from Arizona
American television actresses
Living people
American people of Japanese descent
African-American female models
American female models
African-American models
African-American television personalities
American people of Cherokee descent
African-American actresses
American film actresses
21st-century African-American people
21st-century African-American women
20th-century African-American people
20th-century African-American women
Year of birth missing (living people)